Andrei Svislotski (Russian: Андрей Свислоцкий; 3 June 1960 – 19 December 2022) was a Russian animator. He worked on numerous shows including Curious George, Aaahh!!! Real Monsters, and Rugrats. In 1995, he was nominated for a Daytime Emmy for Aaahh!!! Real Monsters and in 2014 was nominated for another for directing Curious George.

References

External links

1960 births
2022 deaths
Russian animators
Nickelodeon Animation Studio people